Ulmus 'Repura' is an American cultivar raised by the Wisconsin Alumni Research Foundation (WARF) as selection '1193-4', derived from a crossing of 'Regal' (female parent) and a crossing of Ulmus rubra with the hybrid Ulmus pumila × Ulmus davidiana var. japonica.

Description
Not available.

Pests and diseases
'Repura' has not been thoroughly tested for resistance to Dutch elm disease.

Cultivation
Registered in 1993 as 'Repura' by Conrad Appel KG, of Darmstadt, Germany, (ceased trading 2005), the tree is unlikely to be commercially released in either the United States or Europe.

Accessions
Not known.

References

Hybrid elm cultivar
Ulmus articles missing images
Ulmus